Avetik Grigoryan (born January 27, 1989) is an Armenian chess Grandmaster (2008). He was born in Yerevan, Armenia in 1989. He achieved his International Master title at the age of 18 and became a Grandmaster at 19. He is the founder and CEO of ChessMood, a chess education company.

Achievements

2004, 2006, 2007: Won Armenian Youth Championship
2006: Won Yerevan Rapid Chess Cup
2006: Second at European Rapid Chess Championship
2007: Fourth at World Youth Chess Championship, under-18
2008: Second at Belgorod Open
2008: Second at Fajr Open
2010: Won Armenian Chess Championship
2010: Won the Bansko Grand Chess Open
2011: Tied for 3rd–15th in the open section of the 15th Corsican Circuit
2012: Won the Pavlodar Open
2015-2016: Director at Yerevan Arabkir Children and Youth Chess School
2017- 2018: Coach of Thailand Chess National Team
From 2003: Member of Kung Fu Federation of Armenia  
He competed in the 2010 Chess Olympiad.

References

External links

Avetik Grigoryan: "I don’t like to compete with my close ones" Interview at Eritasard.am
Chessmood.com

1989 births
Living people
Sportspeople from Yerevan
Chess grandmasters
Chess Olympiad competitors
Armenian chess players